The Ultimate, published in 2001 and written by K.A. Applegate, is the 50th book in the Animorphs series. It is known to have been ghostwritten by Kimberly Morris. It is the final book (fully) narrated by Cassie.

Plot summary
The book begins with the Animorphs and the rest of the inhabitants of the Hork-Bajir valley drilling and preparing for a surprise Yeerk attack. It is clear they are not ready for attack; the parents, particularly Rachel's mother, are having trouble adjusting, and the Animorphs are in disarray. Jake remains cold and distant to everyone; he no longer wants to be the one to make decisions and no longer has a clear idea about what is wrong and right. Cassie tells everyone that Jake wants a camp meeting and tells him about it mere minutes before the meeting is set to begin; Jake reluctantly agrees to have the meeting. Some of the parents express doubt about the Animorphs' actions and fail to realize the necessity of the war. The Animorphs argue that they know best, and they have experience with the Yeerks. They argue that war is the only way, and that everyone should agree to follow Jake's orders. In the end the whole camp agrees that Jake is to be the leader. Jake reluctantly accepts the burden of leader once again, seeing it as his duty because he is the only one who is capable of leading the Earth resistance.

The next morning, Jake calls a meeting of just the six Animorphs and they agree that something needs to be done to increase the protection of the camp, and increase the overall size of the resistance. They are no longer in contact with the Yeerk resistance, they don't know how strong the organization is, and the information coming from the Chee seems to be very slow. They recognize that they need more than intelligence.  They need a larger force and manpower. They begin discussing the possibility of adding more Animorphs, but none of them has forgotten David, the disastrous last attempt to add a member to the group. However, they feel they don't have much of a choice, as the war is clearly shifting to a more open battle, and the Animorphs need more numbers.  They agree to use the morphing cube to create Animorphs from disabled teenagers about their age. They decide that it would be best to use kids because they would be more likely to accept the story and are less grounded in reality, and that they ought to use disabled teenagers, because the Yeerks would see them as useless host bodies, and there is little chance that any of them are Controllers.

Cassie, Marco, and Jake go to a hospital to begin the recruiting. They find a ward full of candidates and it is quickly determined that a boy named James, a wheelchair user, is the leader. They convince James to join the fight and he assembles his own team of kids that he thinks would be best. Thus the auxiliary Animorphs are formed. The original Animorphs take them (by flying) to the Gardens to acquire battle morphs. The Animorphs and James continue to recruit more kids from the ward, and after three nights of initiation, the auxiliary Animorphs number seventeen. James and two of the others, Craig and Erica, are healed of their afflictions by the morphing power, but the remaining fourteen still remain disabled. Those healed agree to pretend to remain disabled for the duration of the war so as not to alert the Yeerks. James proves to be a natural leader. Cassie wonders how it will work that James is now in charge of a majority of the Animorphs, but Jake is in charge overall. James chooses a male lion as his battle morph, the very same morph of the ill-fated David who challenged Jake's leadership. Jake, however, is not disturbed by this coincidence.

Cassie's father overhears a conversation discussing what they have done and confronts the group about the morality of their actions. Cassie recognizes the voice as the echo of her once-naïve self, and flies away from her father. She realizes more than ever how much she has changed, and how much all of the Animorphs have changed. She realizes that they will never be children again, and that they haven't been children for a long time.

During a separate recruiting session at a school for the blind, the Escafil device is used to give a blind girl the morphing power.  Rachel tells her the story of the Animorphs and the Yeerks and, after giving her the morphing power, gives the girl her DNA to acquire.  Unfortunately, the Animorphs fail to realize until it is too late that the room is under video surveillance, and the Yeerks are alerted of their presence.  Tom Berenson (under control of a Yeerk) arrives with a battalion of Hork-Bajir and claims the Escafil device, all while ordering the captures of Jake, Rachel, Tobias, Marco, and Ax.

Cassie is able to slip away, and she goes to get James and the other new Animorphs at their hospital.  They arrive and go to battle to save the original Animorphs. There are several close calls, and one of the new Animorphs has to demorph in order to avoid dying. Visser One arrives and morphs a monstrous tentacle creature and goes after Jake. The other Animorphs try to save him but cannot get close enough. Once one of the Hork-Bajir-Controllers frees Jake from Visser One's grasp, this proves that the Yeerk resistance movement is not dead. There are still Yeerks fighting from the inside. Jake orders the Animorphs' retreat, and Tom slips into the forest with the Escafil device and with Jake in pursuit. Cassie follows Jake.

There is a confrontation between Jake and Tom in the woods, and Cassie realizes that Jake is actually prepared to kill Tom. Cassie knows that whether Tom kills Jake or if Jake kills Tom, she will lose Jake either way. If she lets him go through with it, he will never forgive himself, no matter how necessary his actions will have been, and the Jake she has come to love will be gone forever. She physically stops Jake from lunging toward Tom, thereby enabling Tom's escape with the device, rather than have Jake kill him and get the morphing cube back.

James and the others arrive back safely. James reports that all of his Animorphs were calm during battle, no one was seriously injured, nobody was screaming to get out, and nobody was threatening to give up their secret. In addition, despite the failed recruitment mission at the school for the blind, the girl given the morphing power had managed to escape by simply walking out of the school calmly in her Rachel morph, where she was found by Cassie later.  She had since been relocated to the Hork-Bajir valley with the other Animorphs.  Cassie reflects that even if Jake and the rest of the original Animorphs go down, at least the resistance would go on. The book ends with Cassie questioning whether the original six Animorphs are still a team, and whether or not they can continue to endure. She remarks that they have been back at the camp twelve hours and Jake has not so much as looked at her. As the book closes, she confronts Jake, and he is furious at her. She remains convinced that while the Yeerks now having the morphing cube is bad, letting Tom get away with it was the right thing to do.

Contributions to the series' story arc
The auxiliary team of Animorphs is formed.
Thanks to Cassie, the Yeerks come into possession of the morphing cube, but until #52: The Sacrifice, only Jake and Cassie will know of the latter's part in this.

Morphs

Jake, Cassie and Marco use various unnamed morphs while demonstrating their powers to the Auxiliaries. Additionally, Tobias uses an unspecified morph to heal from his injuries inflicted by Visser One.
Cassie remarks that one of the Auxiliary Animorphs uses a rhinoceros morph, which is revealed to be Tricia in #53: The Answer, which also reveals that Ray's acquired battle morph in this book was that of a leopard.

Animorphs books
2001 novels
2001 fantasy novels
2001 science fiction novels